Borynia is an urban-type settlement in Sambir Raion, Lviv Oblast (region) of western Ukraine along the flow of the Stryi River. It hosts the administration of Borynia settlement hromada, one of the hromadas of Ukraine. Local government — Borynska settlement council. Population: . 

The main occupation of the population is agriculture and forestry.

The first written mention of the settlement dates back to 1552. In 1870 a treasure of Roman coins from Emperor Trajan times, were discovered in Borynia.

Until 18 July 2020, Borynia belonged to Turka Raion. The raion was abolished in July 2020 as part of the administrative reform of Ukraine, which reduced the number of raions of Lviv Oblast to seven. The area of Turka Raion was merged into Sambir Raion.

Notes

References 
 weather.in.ua
 Карпатський народ

Literature 
 

Urban-type settlements in Sambir Raion